Juan Carlos Maccarone (19 October 1940 – 29 March 2015) was an Argentine Roman Catholic bishop.

Early life and ordination
Maccarone was born on 19 October 1940 in Buenos Aires. After receiving a formal education, he studied Roman Catholic theology. He was ordained as a priest on 17 December 1968.

Bishop
On 30 January 1993 at the age of 52, Maccarone was appointed auxiliary bishop of the Roman Catholic Diocese of Lomas de Zamora, Argentina, with the simultaneous appointment to the Titular Bishop of Mauriana. In 1996, he became bishop in the Roman Catholic Diocese of Chascomús. On 18 February 1999, Maccarone was nominated as bishop in the Roman Catholic Diocese of Santiago del Estero.

Gay sex scandal
In 2005, a video showing Maccarone having sex with a 23-year-old man, his chauffeur, was made public. Maccarone resigned as a bishop on 19 August 2005, which was immediately accepted by then Pope Benedict XVI.

References

Argentine people of Italian descent
21st-century Roman Catholic bishops in Argentina
20th-century Roman Catholic bishops in Argentina
Religious scandals
1940 births
2015 deaths
Roman Catholic bishops of Lomas de Zamora
Roman Catholic bishops of Chascomús
Roman Catholic bishops of Santiago del Estero